Minuscule 871 (in the Gregory-Aland numbering), ε 102 (von Soden), is a 13th-century Greek minuscule manuscript of the New Testament on parchment. The manuscript has not survived in complete condition. It has some marginalia.

Description 

The codex contains the text of the four Gospels with some lacunae (Matthew 28:11-20; John 1:1-36) on 164 parchment leaves (size ). The text is written in one column per page, 29 lines per page.
It has decorated head-pieces. According to Scrivener it is a beautiful copy.

Text 
The Greek text of the codex is a representative of the Byzantine text-type. Hermann von Soden classified it to the textual family Kx. Kurt Aland did not place it in any Category.
According to the Claremont Profile Method it represents textual group 1519 in Luke 1, Luke 10, and Luke 20.

History 

F. H. A. Scrivener and C. R. Gregory dated the manuscript to the 11th century. Currently the manuscript is dated by the INTF to the 13th century.

The manuscript was added to the list of New Testament manuscripts by Scrivener (687e), Gregory (871e). Gregory saw it in 1886.

Currently the manuscript is housed at the Vatican Library (Gr. 2117), in Rome.

See also 

 List of New Testament minuscules
 Biblical manuscript
 Textual criticism
 Minuscule 870

References

Further reading

External links 
 

Greek New Testament minuscules
13th-century biblical manuscripts
Manuscripts of the Vatican Library